Radio ZOS or ZOS Radio is a Bosnian local commercial radio station, broadcasting from Tešanj, Bosnia and Herzegovina. This radio station broadcasts a variety of programs such as music and local news.

It was founded in 1997 as commercial radio station in Tešanj municipality.

Program is mainly produced in Bosnian language at one FM frequency (Tešanj ) and it is available in the city of Tešanj as well as in nearby municipalities in Zenica-Doboj Canton and Tuzla Canton area.

Estimated number of listeners of Radio ZOS is around 243.252.

Frequencies
 Tešanj

See also 
 List of radio stations in Bosnia and Herzegovina
 Antena Radio Jelah
 Radio Tešanj
 Radio Zenica
 Radio Doboj
 Radio Maglaj

References

External links 
 www.zosradio.ba
 www.radiostanica.ba
 www.fmscan.org
 Communications Regulatory Agency of Bosnia and Herzegovina
Mass media in Tešanj
Tešanj
Radio stations established in 1997